William Smith,  (November 16, 1847 – January 22, 1931) was a Canadian politician.

Born in Columbus, Canada West, the son of William Smith and Elizabeth Laing, Smith received his early education in the public schools of Columbus after which he continued his studies in Upper Canada College. An agriculturist, Smith was deputy reeve and afterwards reeve of the township of East Whitby. He was also trustee of Columbus School Board for twenty years. He was the Conservative member of the House of Commons of Canada from 1887–1891, 1892–1896, and 1911–1921.

References 

This article incorporates text from The Canadian album: men of Canada, Vol. 4, a publication now in the public domain.

1847 births
1931 deaths
Conservative Party of Canada (1867–1942) MPs
Members of the House of Commons of Canada from Ontario
Members of the King's Privy Council for Canada